Portugal appeared in the FIFA Confederations Cup for the first time following their Euro 2016 victory.

Record

*Draws include knockout matches decided on penalty kicks. Darker color indicates win, normal color indicates lost.

2017 FIFA Confederations Cup

Group A

Knockout stage

Semi-finals

Third place play-off

Goal scorers

References

Countries at the FIFA Confederations Cup
FIFA Confederations Cup